The Peabody is a historic apartment building at 195-197 Ashmont Street in the Dorchester neighborhood of Boston, Massachusetts.  The -story Tudor Revival brick building was designed by Edwin Lewis, a local architect, and built in 1896–97.  It is named for its original owners Oliver and Mary Lothrop Peabody, who were (along with Lewis), significant proponents of the development of the area.  It was built as a complement to the nearby All Saints' Church, which also stands facing Peabody Square, and was financially supported by the Olivers.

The building was listed on the National Register of Historic Places in 2001.

See also
National Register of Historic Places listings in southern Boston, Massachusetts

References

Apartment buildings in Boston
Apartment buildings on the National Register of Historic Places in Massachusetts
Residential buildings completed in 1896
National Register of Historic Places in Boston
Dorchester, Boston